Mukul M. Sharma is a professor who holds the W. A. "Tex" Moncrief, Jr. Centennial Chair in the Hildebrand Department of Petroleum and Geosystems Engineering at the University of Texas at Austin. He received a B. Tech. degree from the Indian Institute of Technology Kanpur (1980) and then M.Sc. and Ph.D. degrees from University of Southern California in 1981 and 1985 respectively. He has been on the faculty at the University of Texas for the past 37 years and served as Chairman of the department from 2001 to 2005.

In the past, his research interests have included hydraulic fracturing, oilfield water management, formation damage, and improved oil recovery.  He has published more than 400 journal articles and conference proceedings and has 21 patents.

In 2018, Sharma was elected a member of the US National Academy of Engineering for contributions to the science and technology of production from unconventional hydrocarbon reservoirs. He is the recipient of the 2017 John Franklin Carll Award and the 2009 Lucas Gold Medal, SPE's highest technical awards. He is a distinguished alumnus of IIT Kanpur and USC and has also received the 2004 SPE Faculty Distinguished Achievement Award, the 2002 Lester C. Uren Award, and the 1998 SPE Formation Evaluation Award. He served as an SPE Distinguished Lecturer in 2002, has served on the Editorial Boards of many journals, and taught and consulted for industry worldwide.

Beyond academia, Sharma has founded Austin Geotech Services, an E&P consulting company in 1996. He also co-founded Layline Petroleum in 2006, Navidad Energy in 2017, Geothermix in 2020, and Polaris Lithium in 2021.

Awards
 Honorary Member of the Society of Petroleum Engineers, 2019
 US National Academy of Engineering, 2018
 SPE John, Franklin Carl Award, 2017
 SPE Anthony F. Lucas Gold Medal, 2009
 Lester C. Uren Award, SPE, 2003
 SPE Formation Evaluation Award, 1998
 SPE Faculty Distinguished Achievement Award, 2004
 SPE Distinguished Member, 2004
 SPE Distinguished Lecturer, 2004
 Billy and Claude Hocott Distinguished Engineering Research Award, 2010
 Editorial Review Board, SPE Journal, 1996-2000
 Technical Editor, Society of Petroleum Engineers, 1992–95
 Martin Marietta Excellence in Teaching Award, 1996
 Halliburton Foundation, Faculty Excellence Award, 1994

References

 Personal Website 
 UT PGE Faculty Profile 
 ResearchGate Profile 

 Living people
 University of Texas at Austin faculty
 IIT Kanpur alumni
USC Viterbi School of Engineering alumni
Year of birth missing (living people)